The 2011 Taunton Deane Borough Council election took place on 5 May 2011 to elect members of Taunton Deane Borough Council in Somerset, England. The whole council was up for election and the council stayed under no overall control. The Conservatives won 28 seats, exactly half, while the Liberal Democrats took 23. Labour only won three seats, with the two remaining held by independent candidates. Falling only one seat short of an overall majority, the Conservatives took on the leadership of the council as a minority administration, under Councillor John Williams.

After the 2007 elections, the council was under no overall control, with the Conservatives having 26 seats, the Liberal Democrats 25 and the five remaining seats shared between Labour and Independent councillors. Four subsequent by-elections were all held by the incumbent party.

Results

References

2011
2010s in Somerset
2011 English local elections